Chibsah is a surname. Notable people with the surname include:

 Ibrahim Nuhu Chibsah (born 1952), Ghanaian politician 
 Raman Chibsah (born 1993), Ghanaian footballer
 Yussif Chibsah (born 1983), Ghanaian footballer

Ghanaian surnames